"M.B." is a song by Swedish singer-songwriter Orup from his second studio album, Orup 2 (1989). WEA released it as the album's lead single on 1 February 1989.

Track listing and formats 

 Swedish 7-inch single

A. "M.B." – 3:36
B. "Du är inte min vän" – 3:22

 Swedish 12-inch single

A. "M.B." – 6:45
B1. "M.B." – 3:36
B2. "Du är inte min vän" – 3:22

Credits and personnel 

 Orup – songwriter, vocals
 Anders Glenmark – producer
 Lennart Östlund – engineering
 Sofia Wistam – cover art, photographer
 Beatrice Uusma – cover art designer

Credits and personnel adopted from the Orup 2 album and 7-inch single liner notes.

Charts

Certifications

References 

1989 songs
1989 singles
Orup songs
Song recordings produced by Anders Glenmark
Songs about cars
Songs written by Orup
Swedish-language songs
Warner Music Group singles